Tunisia competed at the 1972 Summer Olympics in Munich, West Germany.

Medalists

Silver 
 Mohammed Gammoudi — Athletics, men's 5000m

Athletics

Men
Track & road events

Boxing

Men

Handball

Men's Team Competition
Roster:

Ahmed Bel HadjRaouf Ben SamirMoncef BesbèsTaoufik DjemailAleya HamrouniMouir JeliliMohamed JeljeliMohamed KhalladiMohamed KlaiFaouzi KsouriMoncef OueslatiFaouzi SebabtiAmor SghaierAbdelaziz ZaibiRidha ZitounRached Boudhina

Group B

Classification matches

15th place match

Volleyball

Men's Team Competition

Preliminary round

Pool A

|}

|}

Final round

11th place match

|}

Team Roster

 Mohamed Ben Cheikh
 Moncef Ben Soltane
 Samir Lamouchi 
 Hamouda Ben Messaoud 
 Raja Hayder
 Naceur Bounatouf
 Oueil Behi Mohamed 
 Abdelaziz Derbal 
 Rafik Ben Amor
 Abdelaziz Bousarsar 
 Naceur Ben Othman

Wrestling

Men's Greco-Roman

References
Official Olympic Reports
International Olympic Committee results database

Nations at the 1972 Summer Olympics
1972
1972 in Tunisian sport